General Tests of English Language Proficiency (G-TELP) are English language tests, developed by the International Testing Services Center (ITSC) in 1985. They comprehensively evaluate the practical English use ability of test takers who do not speak English as their native language.

There are different forms of the exam: The G-TELP Test consists of areas such as grammar, listening, reading and vocabulary totaling a possible 99 score. There are also the G-TELP Speaking and Writing Tests. The G-TELP speaking test is composed of tasks that assess content, grammar, fluency, vocabulary, and pronunciation of content. The G-TELP Writing test is composed of tasks that assess grammar, vocabulary, organization, substance, and style. Both assessments use a score scale of Level 1 to Level 11.

History 
In 1983, the International Testing Services Center under San Diego State University conducted research on the development of an English test with professors, linguists, and evaluation experts from the University of California, Los Angeles, Georgetown University, and Rado International College. For about three years after the completion of development, feasibility was verified and completed through sample surveys and preliminary test trials in countries around the world, including the United States, China, Japan, and Saudi Arabia, and the test began officially in 1985. Currently, tests are being conducted in the United States, China, Japan, Taiwan, Singapore, India, Indonesia, the Philippines, Cambodia, Argentina and Saudi Arabia.

Characteristics 
G-TELP test includes the following features: 

 The G-TELP is made by licensed and qualified agents in many countries. The test is a comprehensive English proficiency assessment to measure competence in grammar, listening comprehension, reading comprehension, and vocabulary. It assesses general English language proficiency instead of focusing on merely academic or business contexts, with multiple-choice four-choice questions. 

 The G-TELP provides score quickly. Conveniently, test takers receive the announcement of results within a week of the test date. It also provides comprehensive analysis and diagnosis through absolute evaluation. 

 The G-TELP is criterion-referenced rather than norm-referenced like other commonly-used tests are. The criterion referenced method analyzes the language abilities of A and B in addition to the simple comparison between A and B. The strengths and weaknesses of each structure and question information type are analyzed and diagnosed in detail. The test enhances the educational outcomes by suggesting the learning direction of the examinees. 

 The G-TELP Level Test consists of 5 levels from Level One, the highest level, Level Five, the lowest. By focusing on a specific level of proficiency, each test achieves more extensive sampling of performance than a single test which assesses multiple levels. Listening skills are more emphasized at the lowest level, Level Five, and reading skills are more emphasized at the highest level.

Test formats and content 
This is a comprehensive English proficiency assessment consisting of three areas: grammar, listening, and reading and vocabulary. Each item is composed of multiple choice questions. Scoring is carried out in the absolute evaluation method, and the test is composed of five levels, so it is possible to evaluate each level.

Test scores
The G-TELP's personal score report includes the Overall Proficiency, which indicates whether the grade is Mastery , the Skill Area Scores, which are grammar, listening, reading, and vocabulary scores, and the Task/Structure Score. Linking G-TELP score ranges to other scores. The comparison scores are provided by G-TELP Korea, the company that performs the G-TELP tests.

G-TELP Speaking
G-TELP Speaking is an internationally recognized English Speaking test developed by the evaluation experts of the International Testing Services Center. The Speaking test assesses grammar, vocabulary, organization, substance, and style. The G-TELP Speaking Test takes approximately 30 minutes to complete. The test has about 30 questions and a score range between Level 1 and Level 11, with test takers grouped into eleven proficiency levels for Speaking.

G-TELP Writing
G-TELP Writing is a test that evaluates practical English writing skills of non-native English speakers in everyday life. The writing topics of G-TELP Writing are based on real life and consist of problems that can occur frequently in daily life, such as responding to letters or inquiries, writing reports, and writing journals. In addition, the writing topics and questions are structured so that the test takers can improve the correct composition, expression, and style of writing in English. 

The test lasts about 60 minutes and consists of 5 areas. It is composed of tasks that assess grammar, vocabulary, organization, substance, and style. The test has a score range between level 1 and the level 11, with test takers grouped into eleven proficiency levels for Writing.

G-TELP Business
G-TELP Business is evaluates the ability to use English in a business setting containing business-oriented materials, topics and situations. The examinee's proficiency is measured through his/her responses to the various work-related situations and conditions presented.

G-TELP Business Speaking 
G-TELP Business Speaking evaluates an examinee’s ability to use English to communicate in a business setting. The test includes Basic, Intermediate, and Advanced sections that evaluate proficiency at eleven levels of practical ability. The test assesses Content, grammar, fluency, vocabulary, and pronunciation. The G-TELP Business Speaking Test takes approximately 35 minutes to complete. The test has about 30 questions and a score range between Level 1 and Level 11.

G-TELP Business Writing 
G-TELP Business Writing evaluates an examinee’s ability to write clearly and effectively in a business setting. The test lasts about 60 minutes and consists of 5 areas. It is composed of tasks that assess grammar, vocabulary, organization, style, and substance. The test has a score range between level 1 and the level 11.

G-TELP Jr.
G-TELP Jr. is a test that evaluates the practical English proficiency of elementary and middle school students. It consists of a total of 5 grades and evaluates grammar, listening, reading comprehension and vocabulary. It is scored in an absolute evaluation method.

Countries
This is a global English proficiency evaluation certification test conducted internationally. Test takers can take G-TELP in more than 14 countries.

Use of the test result

Asia

South Korea 
In South Korea, it is used when hiring national civil servants, police officers, maritime police officers, firefighters, military officers, etc. In the case of educational institutions, it is being used as graduation requirements for major universities such as Kyungpook National University, Kyunghee University, Dongguk University, Sungkyunkwan University, Chung-Ang University, and Hanyang University, as well as for language talent selection tests and competitions. CJ Group, LG Group, SK Group, Samsung Group, Shinsegae Group, Mirae Asset Financial Group, Hanwha Group, Hyundai Corporation, etc. are using it for recruitment and promotion of new employees.

In the case of Gwangju Metropolitan City, Gwacheon, Gunpo, Gimpo, Ansan, Anyang, and Pocheon, local governments themselves are implementing a policy to support the test fee for young people living in the area.

China 
In China, it was used as a system to evaluate the communication skills of hotel and lodging establishments in the China National Tourism Administration, and is being used at the government level, such as being used for the 2008 Summer Olympics Organizing Committee's English Language Proficiency Test and Volunteer Selection Test.

Japan 
In Japan, it is used at Tokyo Metropolitan University, Keio University, Nihon University, Kagoshima University, and Nagasaki University.

Taiwan 
In Taiwan, it is being used at National Tainan University, Taipei National University of Arts, and Chinese Culture University.

America

United States 
In United States, It is used as a qualification for official language proficiency in the Korean-American college student training program also known as WEST.

Canada 
In Canada, it is used when selecting exchange students at the University of Victoria.

Europe

United Kingdom 
In United Kingdom, it is used as a qualification for the official language proficiency of a working holiday visa.

See also
 International English Language Testing System (IELTS)
 Test of English Proficiency (South Korea) (TEPS)
 Test of English for International Communication (TOEIC)
 Test of English as a Foreign Language (TOEFL)

References

External links
 Official website

Standardized tests for English language
1985 introductions